The Octagon House Museum, also known as the John Moffat House, is a stucco octagonal house in Hudson, in the U.S. state of Wisconsin. The home was built in 1855 by John Moffatt (1814 Etna, New York-1903 Hudson, Wisconsin) and his wife, Nancy Bennet (1822-1894), who had moved to Hudson from Ithaca, New York the previous year with their ten-year-old daughter. Typical for the time, the Moffats traveled by train to Galena, Illinois where they took a steamboat to Prescott, Wisconsin. Then they traveled by horse and wagon, north to Hudson, which was a prosperous frontier town on the Saint Croix River, benefiting from lumber and flour mills. Two of Nancy's sisters already lived in the community when they arrived. Moffat initially was clerk of the United States Land Office for the Chippewa District and later practiced law before being elected a Saint Croix County judge in 1869. Their home is listed on the National Register of Historic Places.

The house is now owned and operated by the St. Croix County Historical Society as the Octagon House Museum, a historic house museum furnished in mid-19th-century style.  The society purchased the home in 1964.

References

External links
Octagon House Museum - St. Croix County Historical Society

Historic house museums in Wisconsin
Houses completed in 1855
Houses on the National Register of Historic Places in Wisconsin
Museums in St. Croix County, Wisconsin
Octagon houses in Wisconsin
Houses in St. Croix County, Wisconsin
National Register of Historic Places in St. Croix County, Wisconsin